American Hotel may refer to:

In the Netherlands
American Hotel (Amsterdam), a Rijksmonument

In the United States

 American Hotel (Palm Beach, California)
 American Hotel (Aztec, New Mexico)
 American Hotel (Sharon Springs, New York)
 American Hotel (Detroit)
 American Hotel (Staunton, Virginia)
 Packwood House-American Hotel, Lewisburg, Pennsylvania